Roberta 'Bibi' Lee (李美华) a 21 year old student at University of California, Berkeley, and member of the Berkeley Student Cooperative (BSC), was killed in November, 1984. In 1986 her boyfriend Bradley Nelson Page was tried for her murder. He was found to be innocent of murder with the jury coming to a deadlock on the alternate charge of voluntary manslaughter. In 1988, Page was retried and convicted of the same charge. Beginning in 1997 social scientists Richard A. Leo and Richard Ofshe published several works arguing that Page's conviction was based on a false confession.

Incident

Background 
Bradley Page and Roberta 'Bibi' Lee met in the fall of 1983 when both lived at Lothlorien, part of Berkeley Student Cooperative, beginning to date in early 1984. With Lee moving to Fenwick, a BSC apartment residence at the beginning of the fall semester. During this time the relationship between the two becomes tense, particularly right before Lee's disappearance. At this time, Lee was 21 while Page was 24 years old.

November 4 
On November 4, Page and Lee, as well as Lothlorien co-ed Robin Shaw, age 19, went on a morning jog at the Skyline Gate of Redwood Regional Park in the Oakland Hills. During the drive to Skyline Gate, Lee reportedly appeared upset with Page with the overall atmosphere in the car being tense. According to Page, he and Lee had argued the night before, because of what Lee considered to have been a date between Page and another woman, who Page knew in High School.

After arriving at Skyline Gate, the three began running together with the atmosphere still being tense. When they reached Roberts Park, their predetermined destination, Shaw, who was lagging behind the others, saw Page turn in one direction while Lee veered off in another. Shaw followed Page and the two made their way into the park. Lee was not seen again. Page and Shaw jogged the two miles back to Skyline Gate to see if Lee had gone back to the car, but she was not there. They then decided that Page would drive back along the trail to look for Lee. He returned approximately 15 minutes later, telling Shaw that he had not seen Lee. Shaw noticed that he seemed upset, and would later describe him as looking “angry”, “worried”, and “somewhat scared and confused”. They discussed various ways that Lee might be able to get home on her own and after about ten minutes, decided to leave; however, Shaw was not comfortable with this decision.

After Page returned to Lothlorien, he again called Lee's apartment and asked her roommate if Lee was there. Shortly after, Page and several Lothlorien residents went on a prearranged trip to the Exploratorium in San Francisco; Page was the driver. Lee had planned on joining them. Page's roommate recalled Page telling him that Lee had become “separated” during their jog in Oakland and may not be able to make it.

Page returned to Lothlorien around 6 pm; sometime later Page called Lee's apartment and again spoke with her roommate asking her if Lee was there and if she had picked up his earlier message. Page would later state that he stayed at the co-op for the rest of the day, with three Lothlorien residents testifying that they saw him during at least a portion of this period.

At about 11 pm, one of Lee's roommates called Page. His roommate answered the phone and shook Page awake; the roommate was concerned that Lee had not come home that night, and asked Page if he had seen her that evening. Page said he had not and after he hung up, told his roommate that he and Shaw had lost Lee while they were running and had not found her. After discussion, they ultimately decided they needed more information and went back to sleep.

November 5 
At about 2 am, Lee's roommate called again; shortly after Page spoke with her, he got dressed and went to her apartment. After Page arrived, Lee's roommate called various police departments and emergency rooms. When this proved fruitless, they decided that Page would spend the night in Lee's room, and that they would file a missing person report in the morning.

The following morning, Lee's roommate called the Berkeley police and an officer came to the apartment. Page told the officer how Lee had disappeared. Stating that Lee may have been moody or confused about problems with school, but denied that she was upset or angry that morning.

Investigation 
On November 5, in the evening, the Contra Costa Search and Rescue Unit conducted a “full hasty” search of the Roberts Park area. Approximately forty people participated in the search, this included five bloodhound teams, fourteen explorer scouts, several four-wheel drive vehicles, and two horses. The search team worked until around 1 a.m. but did not find Lee's body. A few days afterward, Page, Lee's family and friends and the BSC community set up “The Friends of Bibi Lee,” to conduct an organized search. 

Several days after the search, police was contacted by Karen Marquardt, who claimed to have seen Bibi Lee struggling with a man the same day she disappeared, approximately two miles away from Roberts Park. She stated that on June 4th, just after 12 pm she was driving in Oakland and saw a man pulling a woman up a street toward a parked van. The man was white, in his mid–40's, 6 feet to 6 feet 3 inches tall, weighing 220–250 pounds with a prominent beer belly, beard and unkempt curly hair. She called the police several days later stating that she saw a picture of a missing woman on television and realized that the woman she saw on the street matched the picture and description of Lee. Her description of the man was later used Friends of Bibi Lee flyers.

Approximately a week after its creation, “The Friends of Bibi Lee” was joined by Patricia Chavez, a volunteer with the Missing Children's Project, a former nurse who had experience from conducting previous searches. Under her guidance, the search organization set up headquarters in a donated cooperative apartment that became known as "Treehaven," and began systematically getting out the word that Lee was missing, and set up a phone bank to receive leads. Overall, more than 2,000 volunteers participated with approximately 3 million flyers distributed along the west coast. On November 16th,  following the massive publicity, FBI joined Berkeley and Oakland Police departments to form an official task force devoted to the search.

On December 9th, the Bay Area Mountain Rescue Unit conducted a walking search of the Redwood Park area during which Lee's body was found close to the area she was last seen along the trail. It was located in a thicket of heavy brush some 36 to 37 feet from the eastern edge of Skyline Boulevard, approximately 700 feet south of the entrance to the Roberts Park parking area. Resting on its back in a depression caused by its own weight, covered with a few inches of dirt and compost material.  Small animals had apparently been gnawing at the decomposing flesh, and there were vines growing in the compost material on top of the body. The largely decomposed body was clothed in black and white striped jogging shorts, a blue-green long sleeve shirt, a black T-shirt, and jogging shoes.  The shirts were pushed up to the bottom of the breastbone. There were three open defects in the skin at the back of the head, ranging in size from one to three inches.  The back of the skull was severely fractured. There were also two smaller crush-type breaks of the rear skull and a “ring” fracture encircling the base of the skull.

The pathologist concluded that the fractures to the back of the head were caused by one to three “blunt force traumas.” These injuries could have resulted from someone hitting the head with a rock or club, or forcing the head down on a hard stationary object, such as a rock or tree trunk. They had never seen injuries similar to those suffered by Lee resulting from a simple fall backward. It was determined that blunt force traumas were the cause of Lee's death, with her likely dying within minutes of those injuries. The pathologist also found fractures to Lee's nose bone and right eye socket, which could have been caused by someone administering a backhand blow to the nose, or by kicking, hitting, or striking the face with a blunt object. The pathologist found no other injuries.

Interrogation and confession 
On December 10th, the morning after Lee's body was found, Page was invited for questioning at the police department. Waiving his Miranda rights, he was questioned by two officers, starting just after 10 a.m. Consenting to his statements being recorded, Page explained how he got to know Lee and that they fell in love with each other. He explained how the night before Lee disappeared he had gone to a party with a woman he knew from high school. When he met Lee the next morning to go running, she seemed upset to the point of being irrational. During the drive up to Redwood Park, the mood in the car was “painful” while the atmosphere during the jog was tense. Lee was silent and trailing behind him. Page remembered last seeing Lee at the main driveway in Roberts Park, he continued jogging and the next time he looked back she wasn't there. He and Shaw looked for Lee in the Roberts Park area, and they ran back to the car at Skyline Gate, failing to find her. Shaw stayed at the parking lot, while Page drove back to Redwood park, trying to find Lee. He never stopped, got out of the car, called Lee's name, or honked his horn. The entire search took about 15 minutes. When Page returned to Skyline Gate, he convinced to Shaw to leave without Lee, telling her he knew Lee better than she did and that it was his decision. They drove back to Lothlorien, but Page did not tell anyone there about how Lee had disappeared.

Polygraph test and initial admission 
Page was repeatedly questioned to determine if he was angry at Lee for disappearing in the park, he admitted to being very was upset, but, repeatedly denied injuring her. After the first recorded session Page agreed to do a polygraph test. Around 1 p.m. he was brought into a polygraph room, after putting on Page the necessary attachments and beginning the test, the polygraph specialist asked the same set of questions several times. During the third time, when Page was asked if he physically injured Lee, he began making crying noises, becoming very distraught, and making it impossible to continue the test. The specialist noted that afterward Page did not show any physical signs of crying. The specialist determined that Page tested deceptive when he was asked if he had physically injured Lee and told Page that based on this he thought he was lying. Around 3 p.m. Page was brought back to the interview room and left alone for around twenty-five minutes, when the officers entered page had his head in his hands and was making a low moaning or wailing sound, and was saying, “I really loved her, but, I really loved her.”

The second interview session began with the two officers began repeatedly impressing on Page that they believed he had something to do with Lee's death. Telling him that their suspicions were based on, among other things, the fact he had failed the polygraph test, had only superficially searched for Bibi when she was lost, had convinced Robin Shaw to leave, and didn't tell anyone what had happened when he got back to Lothlorien. When faced with these accusations, Page said that if he did do something he must have blacked it out. The officers insisted that Page was lying, and that they didn't buy his “selective amnesia theory.”  They told Page to close his eyes to try to remember what actually happened, he did so and after a moment said that remembered hitting and kicking her and going off on her, but didn't remember when or where this occurred.  This admission came at 4:10 p.m., or about six hours after Page had first come to the police station.  

The questioning continued with the officers then purposely lying to Page saying that they had found his fingerprints at the crime scene and that they had a witness who saw Page's car south of the entrance to Roberts Park. At around 6 p.m. Page stated that when driving around and looking he remembered driving out of the parking lot to Roberts Park and turning left to go south on Skyline. And that as he drove out onto Skyline, he saw Lee running jogging on the opposite side of the road, coming toward him. Page pulled to the opposite side, parking in the wrong direction facing Lee. He got out of the car, took her by the arm, and led her off the road up a little “hill area.”  As he led her off into a “tree area” he tried to hug and kiss her, to talk to her.  When Lee pulled away, Page became angry and backhanded her, knocking her to the ground. She fell “kind of around a tree.”  She seemed to be unconscious and her nose was bleeding. Page said he left Lee there and went home. He drove back up to the same area later that night between 7 p.m. and 1 a.m., and found Lee dead lying by the tree. He got a blanket from his car and laid down and had sex with her. When he was done, he moved her body closer to Skyline Boulevard where he used a hubcap to cover her with a layer of dirt, smoothing it over so as to give her a “decent burial.”

Taping of the confession 
At around 7 p.m., Page agreed to be taped again, essentially relating the same story he had just told the officers. However, many of his responses seemed confused, tentative, or vague. When the officers asked Page if he saw Lee as he came out of the Roberts Pool parking area, he responded, “I guess I must have.”  When asked if he had spoken to her when he first stopped her he said, “I must have said something, I don't know.” Page stated that at the time he drove back to get Shaw, he did not remember hitting Lee, and did not know where she was. When asked if he had sexual intercourse with Lee's body he said “Yeah, I think so.”  However Page was very specific regarding many of the details of the assault. Like kissing Lee on the top of her head before he backhanded her with his left hand. He stated that she fell on her backside by a tree, and that she had a bloody nose. He noted that when he came back in the evening he parked on the right side of the street, as well as used his car's hubcap to cover her body with pine needles and a big branch. Page completed his taped statement at 7:33 p.m.

Recantment of the confession 
Shortly after 9 p.m., the Deputy District Attorney arrived at the police station to take a third taped statement from Page. Page immediately recanted his confession. Stating that it was a product of confusion, fear, and imagination. And that he never saw Lee after he left Shaw at Skyline Gate. That taping ended at 9:48 p.m.  Page was left alone in the interview room until 11:25 p.m. when he knocked on the door and told the officers he wanted to talk. Their interaction continued at 1:00 a.m. and then Page made his last taped statement. In a rambling statement, Page mentioned a number of factors that caused him to give a false confession: the officers said they found his fingerprints at the scene and were convinced he was involved in the killing, that the polygraph scared him and that he felt guilty for not having helped Lee. He also stated the officers had said he would sit in jail and rot away from the inside if he could not remember. Because of all these factors, the officers convinced him that he might have killed Lee. Consequently, with the officer's assistance he “imagined” a scenario in which he could have killed her.  After this final interview, Page was arrested and charged with the murder of Roberta Lee.

Legal proceedings

First trial 
Page's trial was held in the spring of 1986, approximately one and a half years after the killing. He was charged with first and second degree murder as well a voluntary manslaughter. In their argument prosecution emphasized the tension between Roberts and Page prior to the jog, presenting Page as being frustrated at Roberts, and interpreting her reclusion as open hostility. After Roberts became missing and Page found her along the Skyline road that tension became a physical confrontation. It was argued that after Roberts approached her she began walking away, with his frustration rising he snapped, backhanding her across the face, causing her to fall, and then smashed her head against something firm on the ground, possibly a rock or a tree root, crushing the back of her skull and killing her. The prosecution emphasized that their description was based on Page's recorded statements, which included descriptions of the crime scene, facts that Page could know only if he was involved in the killing. Such as the physical location of the body, it being covered by brush, and her t-shirts pulled up above her chest, something he admitted to doing after he came back later that night and had sex with her body. It was noted that Page began confessing after he was told that he failed the polygraph test and that there was physical evidence directly tying him to the killing. The possibility of the killing being done by an alternate suspect was dismissed on the grounds that the two witness testimonies of seeing Lee abducted by a man, where inconsistent with the known timeline, each other and the location of Roberts' later found body. The prosecution also emphasized that in both cases the alternate suspects would have to return to the park and place Robert's body close to where she was last seen. 

Page's lawyers presented him a popular youth seen as "gentle, kind and artistic" by his peers who was devastated by Lee's disappearance and deeply involved in the massive effort to find her. The principle argument was that the police investigators forced him to confess, confusing and pressuring him to come up with speculations and guesses of how he may have done it, meaning that his statements to the police were not a true admission of guilt. Page testified when the defense made their case. Responding to cross-examination insisted that his statements to the police were not actual memories, he stated:Well, these were things I had made up earlier-that I didn't know where they came from, If I'd actually done it... I couldn't remember any of it, but they were so persistent [the police] and adamant that they had this other evidence, an if I was up there, if they had people that saw me up there, and I couldn't remember, then maybe I was capable of doing it...Cleve Baxter an expert witness who designed the polygraph test the administered by the police testified that the exam was improperly administered and that based on the results the conclusion that Page failed the exam was incorrect.

Page's counsel also argued that his confession was contradicted by the physical evidence.
 The backhanded slap which Page described could not have enough force to make someone fall on the ground and sustain three 3 large skull fractures found on Lee's skull.
 Page described having sex with Lee on a blanket from Page's car, but the blanket contained no evidence of sexual activity or bloodstains.
 Page stated he used a hubcap to bury Lee, but the hubcap did not have any dirt or buildup on it and there was no indication that it was wiped clean.
The burial scene was not a slope like Page stated.
There was no tree limb on top of Lee's body contrary to what was said by Page.
The 1986 trial ended in Page being acquitted of first and second degree murders, with the jury unable to agree on voluntary manslaughter, resulting in a mistrial. The jury was deadlocked 8-4 in favor of conviction.

Second trial and appeal 
Page was retried on the charges of voluntary manslaughter in spring 1988, three and a half years after the murder. In addition to its previous line of arguments, Page's defends team added expert testimony from Elliot Aronson, a professor of psychology at the University of California, Santa Cruz. Professor Aronson testified that a person may give inaccurate information when an authority lies to the person questioned, puts the person under severe stress, causes the person to feel guilty, or makes the person feel that they can't trust his own senses and memory. And that those factors may make the person temporarily vulnerable to persuasion. Although the trial court permitted the expert to testify concerning these general principles of social psychology, the court did not allow him to specifically relate these principles to Page's statements, or to give his opinion concerning the reliability of the confession.

The jury deliberated for six days before finding Page guilty of voluntary manslaughter. The conviction was appealed with Page being allowed to remain out on bail pending the ruling. In its appeal to the California Court of Appeals, made several arguments with the primary one being that in failing to allow Professor Aronson to give an expert opinion on the validity of Page's confession violated his federal constitutional right to present a complete defense. All of the arguments were rejected. Page began his sentence in 1992 because and released on parole in 1995 after serving two years and six months of his six-year sentence.

Aftermath 

Following his first trial Page married his former Lothlorien housemate, who testified that she had seen Page at Lothlorien's courtyard at approximately 9 p.m. on the night of Robert's disappearance. She did not  mention this to anyone, including the police or Page's lawyer, until one month before the first trial, by which time she was pregnant with Page's son. The two divorced prior to Page's release on probation.

In January 1994, Connie Chung on her CBS show Eye to Eye with Connie Chung stated that she thought Page was innocent and was held responsible for Roberts' killing due to a false confession. Interviewing his father, she proposed that Lee's actual killer was Michael Patrick Idhe, a serial killer who at that was serving time for murder in the State of Washington and was investigated for four killings in East Bay.

In 2002 while visiting New Zealand, Page was found guilty of indecent exposure to a woman while hiking on Mount Kakepuku about 11km away from the city of Te Awamutuin. He was repatriated to the United States under police escort a week after his conviction.

Alleged false confession and alternative suspect 
Richard Leo, a University of California, Irvine professor of criminology along with other social scientists view Page's confession as an example of a false confession. Finding it to be a "vague, confused, and speculative confession statement to murdering Bibi Lee" following 16 hours of investigation. And further argued that Michael Patrick Ihde, who was convicted in the 1980s killings of two other San Francisco Bay Area women, and confessed to murdering  a non-white woman in the Bay Area in the same time frame, should be considered as a possible killer of Lee. Emphasizing that Idhe fit the suspects description in the missing person's flyer. Specifically, Idhe's face, hair and beard.

On the other hand, Paul G. Cassell a professor of law at University of Utah, pointed out several issues with Leo's arguments. Cassell quoted the California Court of Appeals to emphasize that the conviction was not solely based on Page's statements, but also based on the details in Page's confession that only a killer would know, such as the location of the body, the location of head and nose injuries, and the method of burial. Regarding Idhe being a possible suspect, Cassell cited a recorded interview of Idhe with a Alameda County Assistant District Attorney where Idhe stated that the woman he killed was black. He countered Leo's assertion that Idhe fit the description of the possible suspect, noting that the defense witness during the trials described the attacker as a man "in his mid-40s, 6 feet to 6 feet 3 inches, 220-225 pounds with a prominent beer belly, beard, and unkempt curly hair", while Idhe was 6 feet 4 inches, weighing 150 pounds, skinny with bright red "carrot top" hair. He also noted that he did not have a car at the time of the killing.

References 

1984 deaths
1984 murders in the United States
Deaths by person in California
Chinese-American history
Murder in California
Female murder victims
Violence against women in the United States
False confessions
History of women in California